Beyond Good and Evil 2 is an upcoming action-adventure video game developed by Ubisoft Montpellier and published by Ubisoft. It is a prequel to Beyond Good & Evil, released in 2003. Its development was characterized in the media by uncertainty, doubt and rumors about the game's future. The sequel was teased at Ubidays 2008 with almost a decade of silence before being officially announced at Ubisoft's E3 2017 conference, although no release window or target platform(s) has been revealed.

Beyond Good and Evil 2 has been referred to as vaporware by industry figures such as Jason Schreier due to its lengthy development and lack of a release date. In 2022, Beyond Good and Evil 2 broke the record held by Duke Nukem Forever (2011) for the longest development for a AAA video game, at more than 15 years.

Gameplay 
Beyond Good and Evil 2 is an action-adventure game set in an open world environment and played from a third-person perspective which takes place at least one generation before the events of Beyond Good & Evil. It has more traditional role-playing elements compared to the first game; the player generates a character that starts the game "at the very bottom of the social system". The character can be male or female. As the player completes various tasks, they improve in various attributes, and gain spacecraft and crew members which they can also improve over time. The players visits planets that have their own societies, and by completing tasks on these planets, gain new technologies or other facets to improve their spacecraft. Its director, Michel Ancel, said that they do anticipate that there will be a narrative element that includes fixed story events, as well as events based on what decisions the player had made in exploring planets.

The game will have single-player and cooperative player support; even as a single-player, the player can participate in a shared universe, with some events affecting all players at the same time. Beyond Good and Evil 2 will require an internet connection to play both single-player and multiplayer.

Development 
Beyond Good and Evil 2 has languished for several years, and is considered to have been in development hell. The game is being developed using a new engine called Voyager Engine, developed by Ubisoft Montpellier. Composer Christophe Héral, who scored the music for the original game, will be returning for Beyond Good and Evil 2.

2003-2016: Initial rumours and leaks 
The original Beyond Good & Evil game, released in 2003, was critically praised and gained a cult following, but was considered a commercial failure. Ancel explained that as he wrote out the game's universe, he found it was bigger than what he could practically include within a single game, and thus anticipated the game to be the first of a trilogy of works. However, the poor sales of this game left its publisher Ubisoft reluctant to invest in a sequel.

Rumors about a sequel began to circulate around 2007, starting with a Nintendo Power interview with Ancel who stated he was working on a new project that was very personal to him, and mentioned his hopes to reuse Jade, the player-character from Beyond Good & Evil, in a future project without changing her personality. Ancel said in a May 2008 interview with the French magazine  that the Beyond Good & Evil sequel had been in pre-production for a year, but was yet to be approved by Ubisoft. Later that month, as part of their "Ubidays" event, Ubisoft released a trailer for the next, yet-named project from Ancel and their Ubisoft Montpellier studio, which had worked on Beyond Good & Evil. The trailer used Beyond Good & Evil music assets and showed characters that appeared to be Jade and Pey'j from the original Beyond Good & Evil. Ubisoft reported that the trailer had all been recorded within the game engine, showcasing high-resolution graphics representative of seventh generation consoles capabilities. A second, leaked trailer appeared for the game on the Internet around May 2009, showing a character that appeared to be Jade running through a crowded street. The trailer was confirmed to be authentic by Ancel, while Ubisoft denied that they had purposely released the footage.

Since these trailers, up until 2016, the state of progress with Beyond Good and Evil 2 was unclear, with conflicting statements made by both Ubisoft and Ancel. While Ancel and Ubisoft reported several times that the game was still in development, rumors circulated that Ubisoft had put the game on hold, that Ubisoft had yet to officially announce the title and thus production was not officially started, and that Ancel had left Ubisoft Montpellier, By 2016, Ancel affirmed that they had put aside work on Beyond Good and Evil 2 to develop Rayman Legends (2013) which enabled them to produce tools that would help with the production of Beyond Good and Evil 2; once work for Rayman Legends was completed, they returned to Beyond Good & Evil sequel. Ubisoft later noted Ancel's time was split between Beyond Good and Evil 2 and Wild, a title developed by Ancel's Wild Sheep Studios outside of Ubisoft.

2016: Official E3 announcement 
In late 2016, Ancel used social media to post images from the game, showing a younger Pey'j, hinting that Beyond Good and Evil 2 may be a prequel. Ubisoft shortly followed by officially announcing the game. Ubisoft showed the first new trailer for Beyond Good and Evil 2 during their E3 2017 conference and was announced as a prequel to the first game. During E3 2017, Ancel confirmed that the 2008 and 2009 trailers were from initial work as a narrative sequel to Beyond Good & Evil, but during development they opted to change direction and make it a prequel, and thus the work previously shown was from an effectively different game.

The platforms for release have not been announced. There had been rumors that it would have been released as a timed exclusive for the Nintendo Switch (under its codename NX) in the prior year, but Ancel confirmed this was not the case. The "Space Monkey Program" lists the game for Microsoft Windows, PlayStation 4 and Xbox One, however Michel Ancel stated that the platforms have not been announced yet, and that the listing was due to a bug. Ancel later told Kotaku that the game is designed to run on many platforms.

2020: Ancel's departure 
When Ancel announced his departure from Ubisoft in September 2020, he stated that both the project and Wild were in capable hands. The French newspaper Libération, which have been following on Ubisoft's troubles with mid-2020 series of sexual misconduct allegations raised against many high-level members of the company, learned that members of Ancel's team found Ancel's leadership on the project to be unorganized and at times abusive, causing the game's development to have many restarts and accounting for the delay since its 2010 announcement. The Montpellier team had reported these concerns to leadership of Ubisoft as early as 2017 but Ancel's close relationship with Yves Guillemot prevented any major corrections to occur until the 2020 internal evaluations that led to Ancel's departure. Ubisoft stated that Ancel "hasn't been directly involved in BG&E2 for some time now" when he left the company.

In July 2021, Ubisoft stated in a financial report that development was "progressing well" but did not answer a question about its release date. In 2022, Beyond Good and Evil 2 broke the record held by Duke Nukem Forever (2011) for the longest development for a video game, at more than 15 years.

Design 
Ubisoft CEO Yves Guillemot stated that Beyond Good and Evil 2 will be made more accessible to the new generation of players, in an effort to make sure the sequel does not suffer the same commercial failure the original did. Guillemot clarified that statement later on, saying that they do not intend to make the game more casual player-oriented.

A core element of the game is the ability to explore several different planets via space travel. To power this, Ancel and the Ubisoft Montpellier team started building a solar system simulation tool about three years prior to the E3 2017 reveal to be used in the game's own engine called Voyageur. This tool uses a combination of designed elements and procedural generation to assemble those elements for a given planet. The development team completed the preliminary work on the tool just before E3 2017, allowing them to start building the rest of the game around it; at that point, Ancel considered that they were only at "day zero" of the game's development.

Premise 

In an interview with Jeux Vidéo Magazine, Michel Ancel stated:"[Beyond Good and Evil 2 will] be in continuity with the first game, with a big variety of levels, lots of emotion in the gameplay, and characters we care about. This time we are dealing with the planet's future, and the relationship with animals..."

On April 3, Eurogamer published a translated interview with Ancel talking about the inspirations behind Beyond Good & Evil and its sequel:"It was a mix of experiences. It was a phantasm to create an adventure game, a universe too. It was the game I wanted to create for a long time. [...] There were a lot of inspirations: the Miyazaki universe, my own inspirations, politics and the media; the theme of September 11 – the CNN show with army messages and the fear climate. And it was a mix from other universes."

He also answered the question of whether or not the game will be a direct sequel to the first game:"Yes! But it is better to discover that when you play, ha ha! But it is clear we want to continue the story – we won't create characters, story. The story continues and we'll react on important events of the first."

However, in June 2017 narrative director Gabrielle Shrager said that the game would be a prequel with the action taking place "about a generation before Jade was born". Ancel indicated that the characters from the previous game will be referenced in some way: "You don't play them, but they are in the world, and they are key to making this world unique... the DNA will be there."

Ancel also talked about the sequel being more immersive and complex compared to the original, largely because of the possibilities of current-generation hardware, but as a result will take longer to develop."We'll conserve the spirit of the first game, but the form will change. For [BG&E], we wanted to create a more cinematographic game, but we didn't have the technical ability to do that. So we simplified. It was fun, because I remember we had to work for Sony to demonstrate how original our game was in order to get the development kit. We wrote BG&E like we were in a film. After, we understood it would be very tricky to reach that immersion on that console! But now, with the next-gen consoles, we feel it is possible to develop the game we thought of for the first. [...] It is very difficult to answer [when the game's going to be released]: there is an unknown aspect."

Notes

References

External links 

 

Upcoming video games
Action-adventure games
Cooperative video games
Open-world video games
Ubisoft games
Vaporware video games
Video game prequels
Video games developed in France
Video games directed by Michel Ancel
Video games featuring female protagonists
Video games scored by Christophe Héral
Video games set in the 25th century
Video games set on fictional planets